Nenhum de Nós (Portuguese for None of Us) is a Brazilian pop rock band formed in 1986 in Porto Alegre, Rio Grande do Sul. The band primarily consists of former Engenheiros do Hawaii member Carlos Stein (guitar), João Vicenti (keyboards), Sady Hömrich (drums), Thedy Corrêa (lead vocals) and Veco Marques (guitar). One of the most famous Brazilian pop rock bands, they are well known for the song "Camila, Camila".

History
After having helped form the band Engenheiros do Hawaii and playing in two shows, Carlos Stein left the band to form another band with some friends that he had known since elementary school, Sady Homrich and Thedy Correa. In 1986 in Rio Grande do Sul they started playing together and came up with the name Nenhum de Nós. They wanted a name that would spark the curiosity of others, but also showed something that each of them had in common: None of us sees very well, None of us stayed in school, None of us joined the army, etc....

Thedy sang and played the acoustic guitar as a bass, Carlos played electric guitar and Sady played the drums. After only 6 shows the band caught the interests of a music producer from São Paulo and recorded their first album, Nenhum de Nós. The album was released in 1987 and contained their now classic "Camila, Camila".

Two years later, in 1989, they released their next album Cardume. Among the songs included on the album was "O Astronauta de Mármore", a Portuguese language version of David Bowie's "Starman".

In 1991 the band played in Rock in Rio II. In 1992 the band was joined by Veco Marques. He would play acoustic and electric guitar, mandolin, and sitar. In 1996 they were joined by their most recent member, João Vicente. Vicente plays the piano, keyboard, and accordion.

Discography

Studio albums
(1987) Nenhum de Nós
(1989) Cardume
(1990) Extraño
(1992) Nenhum de Nós
(1996) Mundo Diablo
(1998) Paz e Amor
(2001) Histórias Reais, Seres Imaginários
(2005) Pequeno Universo
(2011) Contos de Água e Fogo
(2015) Sempre é Hoje
(2018) Doble Chapa

Live/video albums 

 (1994) Acústico ao Vivo no Theatro São Pedro
 (2003) Acústico ao Vivo 2
 (2007) Nenhum de Nós a Céu Aberto
 (2013) Contos Acústicos de Água e Fogo

Sources
 Biography at UOL Cliquemusic
 biography at Whiplash.net

External links
 Official Site
 Fan Club
 

Brazilian rock music groups
Musical groups established in 1986
Musical groups from Porto Alegre
1986 establishments in Brazil